The 2021 Melges 20 World Championships were held from 8 to 12 December 2021 in Miami, United States.

Medal summary

Winners of individual stages

References

External links 
 Official website

Melges 20 World Championships
Sailing competitions in the United States
Melges 20
Melges 20
Melges 20